Matthew Freeman Trundle (12 October 1965 – 12 July 2019) was a British-born New Zealand academic. From 1999 until 2012 he was a member of the Classics Programme at Victoria University of Wellington. From 2012 until his death in 2019 he was a professor of classics and ancient history at the University of Auckland .

Biography
Born in London, England, in 1965, Trundle was the son of Reginald and Elizabeth (née Sydney) Trundle. He studied at the University of Nottingham, graduating with a Bachelor of Arts with joint honours. He then completed a Master of Arts in Roman History and a PhD in Greek history at McMaster University in Canada. The title of his doctoral thesis, supervised by Daniel J. Geagan, was The classical Greek mercenary and his relationship to the Greek polis.

After a period teaching at Glendon College in Toronto, and carrying out research at excavations in Corinth and Isthmia in Greece, Trundle was appointed as a lecturer in classics at Victoria University of Wellington. He rose to the rank of associate professor in 2011, before being appointed to a chair in classics and ancient history at the University of Auckland the following year. His research interests were primarily related to ancient Greek economic, social and military history.

His wife, Catherine Trundle, is a member of the Anthropology Programme at Victoria University of Wellington. Matthew Trundle died from leukaemia in Wellington on 12 July 2019.

Selected publications

References

1965 births
2019 deaths
Academics from London
British classical scholars
New Zealand classical scholars
Alumni of the University of Nottingham
McMaster University alumni
English emigrants to New Zealand
Academic staff of the Victoria University of Wellington
Academic staff of the University of Auckland
Academic staff of Glendon College